Paulding County is a county located in the northwestern part of the U.S. state of Georgia. Part of the Atlanta metropolitan area, it had an estimated population of 168,661 in 2020. The county seat is Dallas.

History
Paulding County was created from Cherokee County by an act of the Georgia General Assembly on December 3, 1832. In 1851, a portion of Paulding County was used to help create Polk County. Other portions of Paulding County were annexed to neighboring counties (Campbell, Carroll, Cobb, Douglas, Haralson, and Polk) between 1832 and 1874. Between 1850 and 1874, Paulding County was expanded through annexation of parts of Carroll, Cobb, Douglas, and Polk counties.

The county is named after John Paulding (October 16, 1758 – February 18, 1818), who was famous for the capture of the British spy Major John André in 1780 during the American Revolution.  André was on a mission carrying secret papers from Benedict Arnold when he was captured.

Geography
The Tallapoosa River originates in Paulding County.

The county is mainly located in the Piedmont region of the state, with a few mountains located in the county that exceed elevations of 1,000 ft. These mountains are considered to be part of the southernmost extensions of the Appalachian Mountains.

The southeastern portion of Paulding County, from just north of Hiram to north of Villa Rica, is located in the Middle Chattahoochee River-Lake Harding sub-basin of the ACF River Basin (Apalachicola-Chattahoochee-Flint River Basin). The very western portion of the county, centered on State Route 101, is located in the Upper Tallapoosa River sub-basin of the ACT River Basin (Coosa-Tallapoosa River Basin), with the majority of the central and northern portions of Paulding County located in the Etowah River sub-basin of the same ACT River Basin.

Adjacent counties
 Bartow County – north
 Cobb County – east
 Douglas County – southeast
 Carroll County – south
 Haralson County – southwest
 Polk County – west

Transportation

Major highways

  U.S. Route 278
  State Route 6
  State Route 6 Business
  State Route 61
  State Route 92
  State Route 101
  State Route 113
  State Route 120
  State Route 120 Connector
  State Route 360
  State Route 381

Secondary highways

 Dallas-Acworth Highway (Old S.R. 381)
 Ridge Road (Old S.R. 61 Connector). Connector in South Paulding that runs between SR 92 and SR 61
 East Paulding Drive (Old S.R. 120 Connector, S.R. 92 Connector and S.R. 176).  Road formerly known as Dragstrip Road
 Goldmine Road (Old U.S. 278/S.R. 6). Former route to Yorkville.
 Bill Carruth Parkway, formerly known as West Hiram Parkway, originally known as Egg Farm Road
 Bobo Road (Old S.R. 92)
 Macland Road (Old S.R. 360).  All of Macland Road west of S.R. 120.
 Mulberry Rock Road
 Braswell Mountain Road
 Cedarcrest Road
 Seven Hills Boulevard
 Harmony Grove Church Road
 Dabbs Bridge Road
 Vinson Mountain Road
 Brushy Mountain Road
 Nebo Road

Pedestrians and cycling

 Dallas Trail Connect
 Graves Path
 Lindsey Path
 Silver Comet Trail

Demographics

2000 census
As of the census of 2000, there were 81,678 people, 28,089 households, and 22,892 families living in the county. There were 29,274 housing units at an average density of 93 per square mile (36/km2). The racial makeup of the county was 90.59% White, 6.96% Black or African American, 0.30% Native American, 0.40% Asian, 0.03% Pacific Islander, 0.57% from other races, and 1.16% from two or more races. 1.71% of the population were Hispanic or Latino of any race.

There were 28,089 households, out of which 46.20% had children under the age of 18 living with them, 68.30% were married couples living together, 9.00% had a female householder with no husband present, and 18.50% were non-families. 14.60% of all households were made up of individuals, and 3.80% had someone living alone who was 65 years of age or older. The average household size was 2.89 and the average family size was 3.20.

In the county, 30.70% of the population was under the age of 18, 7.60% from 18 to 24, 38.40% from 25 to 44, 17.40% from 45 to 64, and 5.90% was 65 years of age or older. The median age was 31 years. For every 100 females, there were 100.20 males. For every 100 females age 18 and over, there were 96.80 males.

The median income for a household in the county was $52,161, and the median income for a family was $56,039. Males had a median income of $38,637 versus $27,341 for females. The per capita income for the county was $19,974. About 4.00% of families and 5.50% of the population were below the poverty line, including 5.60% of those under age 18 and 9.50% of those age 65 or over.

2010 census
As of the 2010 United States Census, there were 142,324 people, 48,105 households, and 38,103 families living in the county. The racial makeup of the county was 77.7% white, 17.1% black or African American, 0.9% Asian, 0.3% American Indian, 1.7% from other races, and 2.3% from two or more races. Those of Hispanic or Latino origin made up 5.1% of the population. In terms of ancestry, 14.7% were Irish, 11.6% were American, 11.2% were German, and 10.4% were English.

Of the 48,105 households, 47.7% had children under the age of 18 living with them, 61.5% were married couples living together, 12.8% had a female householder with no husband present, 20.8% were non-families, and 16.6% of all households were made up of individuals. The average household size was 2.94 and the average family size was 3.30. The median age was 33.8 years.

The median income for a household in the county was $62,348 and the median income for a family was $67,117. Males had a median income of $50,114 versus $37,680 for females. The per capita income for the county was $23,450. About 7.0% of families and 8.2% of the population were below the poverty line, including 9.4% of those under age 18 and 11.8% of those age 65 or over.

Paulding County has been noted for its rapid population growth in the 21st century, often ranking among the fastest-growing counties in Metro Atlanta and the state of Georgia. The rate of population growth increased in each of three consecutive years from 2015 to 2017.

2020 census

As of the 2020 United States census, there were 168,661 people, 56,476 households, and 44,021 families residing in the county.

Education

Elementary Schools
• Abney Elementary School
• Allgood Elementary School
• Baggett Elementary School
• Burnt Hickory Elementary School
• Dallas Elementary School
• Dugan Elementary School
• Hiram Elementary School
• Hutchens Elementary School
• McGarity Elementary School
• Nebo Elementary School
• New Georgia Elementary School
• Northside Elementary School
• Panter Elementary School
• Poole Elementary School
• Ragsdale Elementary School
• Roberts Elementary School
• Russom Elementary School
• Shelton Elementary School
• Union Elementary School

Middle Schools
• Austin Middle School
• Dobbins Middle School
• East Paulding Middle School
• Herschel Jones Middle School
• Scoggins Middle School
• Moses Middle School
• South Paulding Middle School
• P.B. Ritch Middle School
• Sammy McClure Middle School

High Schools
• East Paulding High School
• Hiram High School
• Paulding County High School
• South Paulding High School
• North Paulding High School

Media 
The county legal organ is The Dallas New Era.

Recreation 
 Silver Comet Trail
 White Oak Park
 Ben Hill Strickland Park
 Taylor Farm Parks & Recreation
 Burnt Hickory Park
 Union Park/Mulberry Rock Park
 Samuel U. Braly Sports Complex
 Mt. Tabor Park
 Sara Babb Park (City of Dallas)
 Veteran's Memorial Park

Communities

Cities
 Dallas (county seat)
 Hiram
 Braswell

Unincorporated communities
 New Hope
 Yorkville
 Nebo
 Sudie

Notable people

 Jayne County, formerly known as Wayne County: influential transgender punk rock musician after leaving Paulding County for New York City in 1968
 Caleb Lee Hutchinson, American Idol finalist
 Patty Loveless, country music star; and her husband, record producer Emory Gordy Jr.
 Marty Pevey, Iowa Cubs manager
 Riley Puckett, country music pioneer
 Spencer Scott, Playboy Playmate of the Month for October, 2007
 Ray Traylor, former WWF superstar
 Travis Tritt, country music recording artist
 Zack Wheeler, New York Mets starting pitcher
 Shannon and Shannade Clermont, Models, Video Vixens

Politics
Paulding County is governed by a five-member board of commissioners, including a chairman and four post members. In the State Legislature, Paulding County is represented by two State Senators and four State Representatives. For federal elections, it is located in Georgia's 14th congressional district.

See also

 National Register of Historic Places listings in Paulding County, Georgia
List of counties in Georgia

References

External links
 Paulding County Government
 AccessPaulding.com
 GeorgiaInfo Paulding County Courthouse History

 
Georgia (U.S. state) counties
1832 establishments in Georgia (U.S. state)
Populated places established in 1832
Counties in the Atlanta metropolitan area
Northwest Georgia (U.S.)
Counties of Appalachia